The Sixth Stauning cabinet was the government of Denmark from 8 July 1940, to 4 May 1942.

List of ministers
Some periods in the table below start before 8 July 1940 or end after 4 May 1942 because the minister was in the Fifth Stauning Cabinet or the First Buhl Cabinet as well.

The cabinet consisted of:

References

1940 establishments in Denmark
1942 disestablishments in Denmark
Stauning VI